Menkheperre was an ancient Egyptian theophoric name. Its most famous use is as the throne name of three Egyptian monarchs:
Thutmose III, pharaoh of the 18th Dynasty of Egypt
Ini (pharaoh), pharaoh of the Third Intermediate Period
Necho I, pharaoh of the 26th Dynasty of Egypt

Other notable bearers were:
Menkheperre (prince), prince, son of King Thutmose III
Menkheperre, Theban High Priest of Amun during the 21st Dynasty

People with a very similar name were:
Menkheperraseneb I, High Priest of Amun during the 18th Dynasty
Menkheperreseneb II, High Priest of Amun during the 18th Dynasty
Menkheperure, throne name of Thutmose IV, pharaoh of the 18th Dynasty

Ancient Egyptian given names
Theophoric names